Terry Boyle (2 May 1920 – 2 January 1977) was an  Australian rules footballer who played with Hawthorn in the Victorian Football League (VFL).

Boyle played with Benalla in 1946.

Notes

External links 

Place of birth missing
1920 births
1977 deaths
Australian rules footballers from Victoria (Australia)
Hawthorn Football Club players